Carma Sharon is an actress, director and producer, based in Sydney, Australia. She played the title role in the 2018 film iBOT.

Life and career
Carma was born in Tel Aviv, Israel. Her father was a theatrical actor, mother was a model and her siblings have been involved with singing and performing. She graduated from Trinity College London, with a diploma of musical theatre. She has made her TV debut in the series Deadly Women.

Filmography

Television

Documentary 

As Director
 2019 - Time Travel (short film)
 2019 - The File (short film)
As Producer
 2018 - A Very Odd Engagement (short film)
 2019 - Time Travel (short film)
 2019 - The Digger (short film)
 2019 - The File (short film)

References

External links
 
 

Australian film actresses
Australian film producers
Australian people of Jewish descent
Australian television actresses
Australian women film directors
Australian film directors
Israeli emigrants to Australia
Living people
People from Tel Aviv
1971 births